The New Edge is the seventh album by Acoustic Alchemy, released on 16 March 1993. The album is critically regarded as one of Acoustic Alchemy's better albums, despite only having one track, "Cool as a Rule", on their standard set-list.

There are two different versions of the album. The New Edge was released with an extra track on the European release. The eleventh track, "Act of Innocence", was written in three time. This extends the total length of the disc to 47 minutes.

Track listing

Personnel
 Nick Webb – Steel String Guitar
 Greg Carmichael – Nylon String Guitar
 Dave Pomeroy – Bass
 Patrick Bettison – Bass
 Dan Tomlinson – Drums
  – Percussion
 Derrick James – Saxophone
 Terry Disley - Keyboards extraordinaire!

References

Acoustic Alchemy albums
GRP Records albums
1993 albums